New Musical Theater of San Francisco is a non-profit corporation that produces original musicals. It was founded in 2001 by Anne Nygren Doherty and John Doherty. In has produced a number of musicals, including "Musical Genius"  and "Absolutely San Francisco". It has also produced cabaret shows such as "Round One Cabaret: Taking Charge in a Crazy World".

See also
 Musical Theater

References

Non-profit corporations
Organizations established in 2001